Dear Father may refer to:

 Dear Father (1979 film), a 1979 Italian film
 Dear Father (2022 film), a 2022 Gujarati Film
 Dear Father (book), a children's novel by Bhabendra Nath Saikia
 "Dear Father" (song), a single by Defeater
 "Dear Father", a song by Yes from Time and a Word
 "Dear Father", a song by Sum 41 from Underclass Hero
 "Dear Father", a song by Black Sabbath from 13